Marchesini is a surname. Notable people with the surname include:

 Alessandro Marchesini (1664 – 1738), Italian painter and art merchant of the late-Baroque and Rococo
 Anna Marchesini (1953 – 2016), Italian actress, voice actress, comedian, impressionist and writer
 Ascanio Marchesini (died 1580), Italian Roman Catholic prelate 
 Bruno Marchesini (1915 – 1938), Italian Roman Catholic seminarian
 Giulia Marchesini (born 1998), Italian professional racing cyclist
 Michele Marchesini (born 1968), Italian sailor
 Nino Marchesini (1895 – 1961), Italian actor
 Pietro Marchesini (1692 - 1757), Italian painter of the Baroque period
 Riccardo Marchesini (born 1963), Italian canoer and paracanoer
 Víctor Marchesini (1930–1999), Argentine lawyer and politician

See also 

 Marchesi (surname)